A Tensor lamp is a trademarked brand of small high-intensity low-voltage desk lamp invented by Jay Monroe. The lamp was mainly popular during the 1960s and 1970s. The lamp was originally used by doctors and dentists, and later became more widely used. Although the first prototype was created in 1959, the lamp was not made available to public until 1960. The brand was manufactured by the Tensor Corporation.

History
The first Tensor lamp consisted of assembling together a 12-volt automobile parking light bulb and reflector made from an ordinary kitchen measuring cup. Monroe fixed the cup to a metal tube that was attached to a transformer, which reduced 115-volt house current to 12 volts. Because of the small bulb, the entire lamp could be made smaller with a light-directing shade. Monroe was issued a patent for his invention.

By 1963, the lamp was sold to the general public as a decorative desk lamp for home and office when several other manufacturers entering the field. The main competitors to Tensor's high-intensity and low voltage lamp during the 1960s were the similarly looking Lampette brand of lamps manufactured by Koch Creations, the Mobilette, a series of Italian designed lamps sold by Stiffel, and the Michael Lax's designed Lytegem lamp that was manufactured by Lightolier.

See also
 Tiffany lamp
 Tizio
 Tolomeo desk lamp

References

Lighting
Light fixtures